Pseudelma is a genus of air-breathing land snails, terrestrial pulmonate gastropod mollusks in the subfamily Enneinae of the family Streptaxidae.

Distribution 
The distribution of the genus Pseudelma includes:
 Mayotte
 Comores

Species
Species within the genus Pseudelma include:
 Pseudelma auribole Abdou, Muratov & Bouchet, 2008
 Pseudelma auriculata (Morelet, 1881)
 Pseudelma aurititi Abdou, Muratov & Bouchet, 2008
 Pseudelma bisexigua (F. Haas, 1951)
 Pseudelma incisa (Morelet, 1881)
 Pseudelma inconspicua (Morelet, 1881)
 Pseudelma martensiana (Morelet, 1881)
Species brought into synonymy
 Pseudelma madagascariensis Fischer-Piette, F. Blanc & Vukadinovic, 1974: synonym of Elma messageri (Bavay & Dautzenberg, 1904)

References

 Abdou A., Muratov I.V. & Bouchet P. (2008). Streptaxid microcosm: the radiation of the endemic genus Pseudelma Kobelt 1904 (Gastropoda Pulmonata Streptaxidae) on Mayotte, Comores. Tropical Zoology. 21: 123-151

External links
 Kobelt, W. (1904-1905). Die Raublungenschnecken (Agnatha). Erste Abtheilung: Rhytididae & Enneidae. In: Systematisches Conchylien-Cabinet von Martini und Chemnitz, Ersten Bandes, zwölfte Abtheilung (B), erster Theil. (1) 12b (1, 490): 80-128, pls. 14-18 (1904); (1) 12b (1, 492): 129-192, pls. 19-24 (1904); (1) 12b (1, 493): 193-232, pls. 25-30 (1904); (1) 12b (1, 495): 233-296, pls. 31-35, 33a (1904); (1) 12b (1, 497): 297-362, pls. 36-41 (1905). Nürnberg (Bauer & Raspe). Note: this is a continuation of "Agnatha Moerch. Die Raublungenschnecken" started by O.F. von Möllendorff (1903-1904) (see footnote on page 79)
 Haas F. (1951). Note on some streptaxids. The Nautilus. 64(4): 133-134

Streptaxidae